Iñaki Salvador Gil (born 10 April 1962, San Sebastián) is a Basque Spanish jazz and classical pianist, arranger and composer. He is known for his Basque classic studies of piano, accordion, harmony, and counterpoint. He often collaborated with Mikel Laboa, and has performed with him in the United States. He has composed the score for several films, such as Maite (1994).

References

1962 births
Living people
People from San Sebastián
Spanish jazz pianists
Spanish classical pianists
Latin jazz pianists
Spanish composers
Spanish male composers
Basque musicians
21st-century classical pianists
21st-century male musicians
21st-century Spanish musicians